Johanna Christina von Hofsten (3 September 1832 – 19 December 1913), was a Swedish-language children's writer.

Life and work 
Johanna Christina von Hofsten was born into the von Hofsten family at Valåsen Manor in Karlskoga Socken (present-day Valåsen och Labbsand). She was the fourth of five children to Ironmaster Erland von Hofsten and Johanna Fredrika Nordenfelt.

Von Hofsten died on 19 December 1913 in Gerum socken.

References

External links 

 Johanna Christina von Hofsten at Project Runeberg

1832 births
1913 deaths
Swedish nobility
19th-century Swedish writers
Swedish children's writers
Swedish-language writers
Writers from Karlskoga
Johanna Christina